James Duncan Anderson (born 17 December 1931) is an Australian former Australian rules footballer and first-class cricketer.

Anderson played as a full-forward in the Victorian Amateur Football Association (VAFA) from 1950 to 1954. He played four seasons with the University Blues, followed by a season with the Old Melburnians. He was noted for his prolific goalkicking and was the leading goalkicker in Section A in every season he played in, the only player to have done so. He was the vice-captain of the club during the 1952 season, where the Blues went on win their first Premiership title, defeating Ormond in the Grand Final, with Anderson scoring ten of the twenty goals that Blues put past Ormond. He took on a dual role in the 1953 season, acting as both captain and coach of the club, as the Blues finished as runners-up. Anderson also represented Victoria as an amateur in eight matches, including at the 1951 and 1953 AAFC Carnivals.

In August 1954, Anderson left Australia to study in the United Kingdom, attending Magdalen College, Oxford. In December, he was named Blue of the Game in the annual Australian rules match between Oxford and Cambridge, where he played alongside future Prime Minister Bob Hawke. In May 1955, he played cricket in first-class two matches for Oxford University. His highest score of 4* came against Warwickshire. His best bowling of 4/68 came against Yorkshire.

Despite having not played competitive football for two years, Anderson appeared in a demonstration match at the 1956 Summer Olympics. He was selected to play in a team representing the Victorian Amateur Football Association against a combined team of players from the Victorian Football League (VFL) and the Victorian Football Association (VFA). Although the combined VFL/VFA team were favoured to win the match, some football journalists backed the VAFA team, citing Anderson's performances at both team training and in a "special" practice match as reasons for a potential upset. On 7 December, the VAFA team were victorious, defeating the combined team by 26 points. Anderson finished the match with three goals.

See also 
 Australian football at the 1956 Summer Olympics

References

External links 
 

1931 births
Living people
Australian rules footballers from Melbourne
Cricketers from Melbourne
Australian footballers at the 1956 Summer Olympics
Australian cricketers
Oxford University cricketers
Alumni of Magdalen College, Oxford
Old Melburnians Football Club players